Titash Ekti Nadir Naam, or A River Called Titas, is a 1973 film that was a joint production between India and Bangladesh directed by Ritwik Ghatak. The movie was based on a novel by the same name, written by Adwaita Mallabarman. The movie explores the life of the fishermen on the bank of the Titas River in Brahmanbaria, Bangladesh.

Rosy Samad, Golam Mostafa, Kabori, Prabir Mitra, and Roushan Jamil acted in the main roles. The shooting of the movie took a toll on Ghatak's health, as he was suffering from tuberculosis at the time.

Alongside Satyajit Ray's Kanchenjungha (1962)
and Mrinal Sen's Calcutta 71 (1972), Titas Ekti Nadir Naam is one of the earliest films to resemble hyperlink cinema, featuring multiple characters in a collection of interconnected stories in the style of The Rules of the Game (1939), predating Robert Altman's Nashville (1975). The film topped the list of 10 best Bangladeshi films in the audience and critics' polls conducted by the British Film Institute in 2002.

Plot

A fisherman by the River Titas, Kishore, marries a young girl, Rajar Jhi, accidentally when he visits a nearby village. After their wedding night, Rajar Jhi is kidnapped on the river. On losing his wife, Kishore becomes mad. Meanwhile, his young bride fights with the bandits, jumps into the river and is saved by some villagers. Unfortunately, the young bride knows nothing about her husband, she doesn't even know her husband's name. The only thing she remembers is the name of the village Kishore belongs to. Ten years later, she attempts to find Kishore with their son. Some residents of Kishore's village refuse to share food with her and her son because of the threat of starvation. A young widow, Basanti, helps the mother and child. Later it turned out that Kishore and Basanti were childhood lovers. Director Ghatak appears in the film as a boatman, and Basanti's story is the first of several melodramatic tales.

Cast 
 Rosy Samad as Basanti
 Kabori Choudhury as Rajar Jhi
 Rowshan Jamil as Basanti's mother
 Rani Sarkar as Munglee
 Sufia Rustam as Udaytara
 Prabir Mitra as Kishore
 Bonani Choudhury as Morol Ginni
 Chand as Subla
 Golam Mustafa as Ramprasad & Kader Milan
 Ritwik Ghatak as Tilak Chand
 Fakrul  Hasan Bairagi as Nibaran Kundu
 Shafikul Islam as Ananta
 Chetana Das
 Farid Ali
 Abul Hayat

Reception

Critical response

Dennis Schwartz, who gave the film an "A" grade, wrote: "It's a passionate film made with great conviction, that features a marriage ceremony with the only sounds heard being the bride's heavy breathing. The pic is filled with traditional music, tribal customs, an abduction, a murder, a suicide, an insanity and starvation. In the end, it signals the demise of a long-standing culture because of various reasons, such as the inability to change with the times, the fractured nature of the village and their inability to deal with outside forces like money-lender schemers. It's a haunting and unforgettable film about the joys, anguish and rage of a community that was unable to survive. Ghatak clearly uses the story as a tragic analogy of what happened to the Bengali people as a result of the Partition of Bengal between British India and Pakistan in 1947." Christel Loar of Popmatters (who scored the film an 8 out of 10) writes that "[i]n addition to using the river itself as a character, a metaphor, and a vehicle for the storytelling, another aspect of A River Called Titus is its references to Indian cultural and spiritual themes. Classical mythic imagery flows through the film on a course that parallels the river's, to a certain extent. Not coincidentally, the main relationships of Kishore, Basanti and Rajar Jhi mirror tales of the romantic life of Krisha [sic], and the lovers' triangle he had with his wife, Rukmini, and his lover, Radha." Jordan Cronk of Slant called the film, in comparison to Dry Summer, "less tightly coiled, more meditative, an appropriate approach for a film preoccupied with the existential concerns of a gallery of characters living along the shores of the film’s namesake river. Spanning an entire generation, the film utilizes its main character, Basanti, who endures a litany of tragedies and mundanities alike as she’s married off only to be sacrificed to nature’s unforgiving advancement, as a symbol for countless victims of Bangladesh’s partition era, when the division of India and Pakistan left thousands of people impoverished." Adrian Martin, scoring the film four-and-a-half stars out of 5, labelled the film a "pure melodrama". "He makes use of cultural archetypes familiar to the broadest Indian audience, such as the suffering mother, the wise (or crazy) old man of the village, the local gossips, the blushing, virginal bride" he writes, "and then twists narrative conventions, both subtly and provocatively. The film is, in line with Ghatak’s Brechtian orientation, a broken, deliberately disjointed melodrama, arranged in two starkly distinct halves, and gives itself the freedom to hop from one character’s story thread to another’s — an uncommon technique in world cinema of the time." He called Ghatak's "film language every bit as sophisticated and restless as that of Jean-Luc Godard or Lynne Ramsay. Ghatak was a poet of rupture."

Conversely, Mike D'Angelo of The A.V. Club, who gave the film a "C−", called it "clumsily melodramatic tale of the fallout that occurs after bandits kidnap a pregnant bride...Leaping forward in time without signposts and continually wandering off on pointless digressions, the film is somehow both overly plotted (coincidences and conveniences abound) and dramatically shapeless, with its lauded anticipation of “hyperlink” cinema—abrupt shifts in focus from one character to another—often coming across as random. What’s more, Ghatak has enormous difficulty simply establishing a coherent tone; the story’s most tragic moment is so broadly played that it threatens to inspire laughter rather than anguish." Despite this, he lauded its "breathtaking black-and-white images on the banks of the titular river" and recommended Meghe Dhaka Tara, "his consensus masterpiece", as a better introduction to his filmography.

Screenings in different festivals 
 2017: Ritwik Ghatak Retrospective UK, at Dundee Contemporary Arts, Dundee, Scotland, UK, Programme curated by Sanghita Sen, Department of Film Studies, St Andrews University, UK

Accolades 
In 2007, A River Called Titas topped the list of 10 best Bangladeshi films, as chosen in the audience and critics' polls conducted by the British Film Institute.

References

External links
 
A River Called Titas: River of No Return an essay by Adrian Martin at the Criterion Collection

1973 films
1973 drama films
Bengali-language Indian films
Bengali-language Bangladeshi films
Bangladeshi drama films
Films directed by Ritwik Ghatak
Hyperlink films
1970s Bengali-language films
Indian drama films